Kea Kühnel  (born 16 March 1991) is a German freestyle skier who competes internationally. She competed in the World Championships 2017, and participated at the 2018 Winter Olympics.

References

External links

1991 births
Living people
German female freestyle skiers 
Olympic freestyle skiers of Germany 
Freestyle skiers at the 2018 Winter Olympics 
21st-century German women